Haas Building may refer to the Haas Building (Los Angeles) and if not then maybe you’re looking for:
in the United States
(by state then city)
Haas Candy Factory, San Francisco, California, listed on the NRHP in San Francisco
L. Haas Store, Carmi, Illinois, listed on the NRHP in White County
Elias Haas Building, St. Louis, Missouri, listed on the NRHP in St. Louis 
Haas Building (St. Louis, Missouri), listed on the NRHP in St. Louis
Rohm and Haas Corporate Headquarters, Philadelphia, Pennsylvania, NRHP-listed